Al-Burdayni Mosque is a mosque in Cairo, Egypt. It is located in Al-Dawoudia, near the Mosque of al-Malika Safiyya. It was built by a wealthy merchant, Kareem al-din al-Bardayni in 1616 during the Ottoman rule. The building is made of stone and has gates erected in 1629 on two sides on the west, right of the fountain. This mosque was built under Ottoman rule after the Ottomans defeated the Mamluks in 1517 and ruled over Egypt until 1867. The mosque is built in Mamluk style not Ottoman style which would have been the prevailing style of choice at the time. This is because Karim al-Din al-Burdayni did not align himself with the cultural practices of the Turks neither the Egyptians.

Description
Although the mosque was built in the Ottoman era, the architecture retains many of Mamluk style, including the fountain which is full of motifs and inscriptions. Al- Burdayni mosque is small in scale and L-shaped making the mosque visible from two different faces both serve as entryways. To the right of the mosque is where the minaret stands. The minaret is where many different Islamic architectural styles come together. The first tier of the minaret is octagonal in shape with carvings of triangular arches, the second tier circular with vegetal motifs classic to Islamic architecture, finally a bulb like structure rests on the top with muqarna or stalactites like ornament around it.

The interior decoration also contains elements of Mamluk state of Circassia gathered in details. This is a small, albeit protected beautifully stained marbles which cover the walls and the roofs above the windows decorated with colored glass to create the sense of consistency. Its wooden ceiling is also considered one of the outstanding crafts of all the Egyptian historic mosques, and the skillful carpentry craftsmanship is also displayed in the work of minbar or handrails. The minaret is unique since it is the only minerat during the Ottoman time to have a band with an inscription of the date 1623 around the octagonal bottom part of the minaret.

The nearest mosque to al- Burdayni mosque is the mosque of Malika Safiya which is not orniamated at all. These two mosques contrast in size. Al- Burdayni mosque is built at a humble size but heavily ornamented while the Malika Safiya shows strength and power through its scale and zero to none ornimation.

The contrast of style and ornament of other mosques compared to al- Burdayni is because of the different patrons. Karim al-Din al- Burdayni was a wealthy merchant that would have seen the materials that were ultimately used in this mosque during his work and travel.

The mosque on the inside revives Mamluk art and architecture. Detailed stained glass windows that allow sunlight to enter and decorate the space with color. The Minbar is made of wood and mother of pearl with geometric designs which creates a shine from the pearl and more ornament from the mosaics. On the other side of the Minbar is a Dikka, or columns in a mosque for the Imam to stand between to recite Quran from for everyone in the mosque to hea This Dikka also has an inscription band in late Mamluk style. The Mihrab or prayer niche is covered with inlaid marble and blue-glass plates, which is a symbol of the exceptional Mamluk tradition and culture. The walls are made with slabs of polychrome marble with intricate details and mosaics. 

There is also a raised gallery in the mosque that is also extremely decorated. Square Kufic calligraphy of Quranic text is used to beautify the space and confirm that it is an Islamic structure. The wooden ceiling is a stylistic choice to diffuse the harsh sun into a soft glow for worshippers in the mosque.

See also

 Lists of mosques
 List of mosques in Africa
 List of mosques in Egypt

References

External links

 Government Website of Islamic artifacts

17th-century mosques
Mamluk architecture in Egypt
Religious buildings and structures completed in 1616
Burdayni Mosque
Establishments in Ottoman Egypt